John P. LaWare (February 20, 1928 – December 13, 2004) was an American banker who served as a member of the Federal Reserve Board of Governors from 1988 to 1995.

Early life and education 
LaWare was a native of Columbus, Wisconsin. He was born on February 20, 1928. After receiving a B.A. in biology from Harvard College in 1950, he earned a M.A. in political science from the University of Pennsylvania in 1951, after which he was in the U.S. Air Force during the Korean War.

Banking career 
In 1953, LaWare joined Chemical Bank, where he worked for 25 years, rising to senior vice president of marketing. In 1978, he joined Shawmut Bank in Boston, Massachusetts, as president. Two years later, he became chairman and CEO of both Shawmut Bank in Boston and its holding company, Shawmut Corporation. During his time at Shawmut, he was chairman of the Massachusetts Business Roundtable, chairman of the Massachusetts Bankers Association and Children's Hospital in Boston. He was also a director of the Federal Reserve Bank of Boston.

Federal Reserve 
President Reagan nominated LaWare to the Federal Reserve Board in 1988. In spite of the fact that LaWare was a Democrat, Senator William Proxmire (Democrat, Wisconsin) initially opposed his nomination, but eventually he was confirmed by the Senate. He was on the Federal Reserve Board until 1995.

Honors 
LaWare received honorary doctors' degrees from Suffolk University and Northeastern University. He was also honored as a Distinguished Citizen by the Boy Scouts of America, the Minuteman Council and the College of Business of Northeastern University. He died in 2004.

References 

1928 births
2004 deaths
20th-century American businesspeople
Federal Reserve System governors
Harvard University alumni
Law and economics scholars
University of Pennsylvania alumni
Reagan administration personnel
George H. W. Bush administration personnel
Clinton administration personnel